Dice control in casino craps is a controversial theory where proponents claim that individuals can learn to carefully toss the dice so as to influence the outcome. A small but dedicated community of dice shooters claim proof of dice influencing in casino conditions. The concept of such precision shooting claims to elevate craps from a random game of chance to a sport, like bowling, darts, or pool. Many within the advantage gambling community still doubt if dice control can overcome the house advantage on craps.

Controlled shooting
The concept of "controlled shooting" goes beyond simply "setting the dice" prior to shooting. It purports to involve limiting the rotational characteristics of the dice. The theory is that if the dice are properly gripped and tossed at the correct angle they will land just before the back wall of the craps table, then gently touch the wall, greatly increasing the probability of their remaining on the same axis. If executed properly and consistently this technique would be able to change the game's long-term odds from the house's favor to the player's favor.

Notable proponents of dice control
Chris Pawlicki (author of Get The Edge At Craps: How to Control the Dice) explains the math and science behind dice control. Stanford Wong, well-known advantage player and gaming author, also discusses dice control in his book Wong on Dice. Pawlicki and Jerry L. Patterson co-developed PARR (Patterson Rhythm Roll) in 1997, which claims to be the first course on how to set and control dice.

Debate over dice control
Jim Klimesh, director of casino operations for Indiana's Empress Casino Hammond believes it is sometimes possible to control the dice with certain throws that do not hit the back wall of the craps table. One example is the "army blanket roll", named after the playing surface of the dice games of American servicemen during World War II. In the army blanket roll, a player sets the dice on an axis and gently rolls or slides them down the table. If the shooter is successful, the dice will not leave the axis they are rolled on and will come to rest before hitting the back wall. A successful shooter would affect the odds significantly.

But most casinos require that the dice touch the wall in order for a throw to be valid. The chances of altering the odds when the dice bounce off a surface of rubber pyramids are much slimmer, no matter what axis the dice were on before they hit. Dice control proponents advocate a throw that gently bounces off of the back wall and comes to rest after barely touching it. Experiments have been conducted on the subject of dice control, with inconclusive results.

References

Dice